BioSocieties is a quarterly peer-reviewed scientific journal covering the scholarly exploration of the crucial social, ethical and policy implications of developments in the life sciences and biomedicine. It was established in 2006 and was originally published by Cambridge University Press on behalf of the London School of Economics and Political Science (LSE). In 2010, the journal was acquired by Palgrave Macmillan, which has published it ever since. The editors-in-chief are Nikolas Rose (King's College London), Ilina Singh (University of Oxford), and Catherine Waldby (Australian National University). According to the Journal Citation Reports, the journal has a 2016 impact factor of 2.162

References

External links

Palgrave Macmillan academic journals
Publications established in 2006
Quarterly journals
English-language journals
Policy analysis journals
Biology journals
Cambridge University Press academic journals